Plougonven is a commune in the Finistère department of Brittany in north-western France.

Population
Inhabitants of Plougonven are known in French as Plougonvenois.

International relations
Plougonven is twinned with Inniscarra, County Cork, Ireland .

See also
Communes of the Finistère department
Parc naturel régional d'Armorique
Yann Larhantec Sculptor
Calvary at Plougonven
Plougonven Parish close

References

External links

Mayors of Finistère Association 

Communes of Finistère